In machine learning, the Highway Network was the first working very deep feedforward neural network with hundreds of layers, much deeper than previous artificial neural networks.
It uses skip connections modulated by learned gating mechanisms to regulate information flow, inspired by Long Short-Term Memory (LSTM) recurrent neural networks.
The advantage of a Highway Network over the common deep neural networks is that it solves or partially prevents the vanishing gradient problem, thus leading to easier to optimize neural networks.
The gating mechanisms facilitate information flow across many layers ("information highways").

Highway Networks have been used as part of text sequence labeling and speech recognition tasks.
An open-gated or gateless Highway Network variant called Residual neural network was used to win the ImageNet 2015 competition. This has become the most cited neural network of the 21st century.

Model 
The model has two gates in addition to the H(WH, x) gate: the transform gate T(WT, x) and the carry gate C(WC, x). Those two last gates are non-linear transfer functions (by convention Sigmoid function). The H(WH, x) function can be any desired transfer function.

The carry gate is defined as C(WC, x) = 1 - T(WT, x). While the transform gate is just a gate with a sigmoid transfer function.

Structure 
The structure of a hidden layer follows the equation:

References

Machine learning